The chief minister of Kerala is the chief executive of the Indian state of Kerala. This is a state's de jure head, but de facto executive authority rests with the chief minister. Following elections to the Kerala Legislative Assembly, the state's governor usually invites the party (or coalition) with a majority of seats to form the chief minister, whose council of ministers are collectively responsible to the assembly. Given that he has the confidence of the assembly, the chief minister's term is for five years and is subject to no term limits.

Following India's independence from the British Raj in 1947, the states' monarchs of Travancore and Cochin instituted a measure of representative government, headed by a prime minister and his council of ministers. On 1 July 1949 Travancore and Cochin were merged to form Travancore-Cochin state. The Malabar District and Kasaragod region of South Canara, which together constitute more than half of present state of Kerala, had their representatives in the Madras Legislative Assembly.

On 1 November 1956, the States Reorganisation Act redrew India's map along linguistic lines, and the present-day state of Kerala was born, consisting solely of Malayalam-speaking regions, by merging Cochin, Malabar, and Travancore regions, and the Kasaragod region of South Canara. The first assembly election in Kerala state was held in February–March 1957. The first Kerala Legislative Assembly was formed on 5 April 1957. The Assembly had 127 members including a nominated member. Since then, 12 people have served as the chief minister of Kerala. The first was E. M. S. Namboodiripad of the Communist Party of India, whose tenure was cut short by the imposition of President's rule. Kerala has come under President's rule for four years over seven terms, the last of them in 1982. Since then the office has alternated between leaders of the Indian National Congress and of the Communist Party of India (Marxist). E. K. Nayanar is 
the longest serving holder of the office for a total of 10 years, 353 days. Pinarayi Vijayan is the incumbent chief minister; his Left Democratic Front government has been in office since 25 May 2016.

Key

 №: Incumbent number
  Assassinated or died in office
  Returned to office after a previous non-consecutive term
  Resigned
  Resigned following a no-confidence motion

Precursors

Prime ministers of Travancore (1948–49)

Prime ministers of Cochin (1947–1949)

Chief ministers of Travancore-Cochin (1949–1956)
After India's independence in 1947, Travancore and Cochin were merged to form Travancore-Cochin on 1 July 1949. On 1 January 1950, Travancore-Cochin was recognised as a state.

List of Chief Ministers of Kerala 
The Government of India's 1 November 1956 States Reorganisation Act inaugurated the new Kerala state, incorporating Malabar District, Travancore-Cochin (excluding four southern taluks and Sengottai Taluk which were merged with Tamil Nadu), and the Kasaragod taluk of South Kanara district. A new Legislative Assembly was also created, for which elections were held in 1957.

Statistics
List of Chief Ministers by length of term

Timeline

See also
 Kerala Council of Ministers
 Deputy Chief Ministers of Kerala

Notes

Footnotes

References

Further reading

External links

 Official website of Chief Minister of Kerala

 
Kerala
Chief Ministers
Chief Ministers